Pen Twyn Glas is a top of Pen Allt-mawr in the Black Mountains in south-eastern Wales. It lies in between Pen Allt-mawr and Mynydd Llysiau.

The summit is merely a grassy bump on the ridge marked by a pile of stones.

References

External links
 www.geograph.co.uk : photos of Waun Fach and surrounding area

Black Mountains, Wales
Mountains and hills of Powys
Hewitts of Wales
Nuttalls